Alexis Pritchard (born 24 September 1983) is a South-African born New Zealand boxer. On 5 August 2012 she became the first New Zealand woman to win an Olympic bout when she beat Tunisia's Rim Jouini in the Round of 16.

She moved to New Zealand at the age of 14 and originally took up boxing in 2003 to get fit.

Pritchard retired whilst still the New Zealand champion but after failing to qualify for the Rio Olympics. She was a batonbearer for the 2022 Commonwealth Games Queen's Baton Relay when the baton came to Auckland in March 2022.

References

External links
 
 
 
 

1983 births
Living people
New Zealand women boxers
Lightweight boxers
Olympic boxers of New Zealand
Boxers at the 2012 Summer Olympics
Boxers at the 2014 Commonwealth Games
Boxers at the 2018 Commonwealth Games
South African emigrants to New Zealand
Commonwealth Games medallists in boxing
Commonwealth Games bronze medallists for New Zealand
Medallists at the 2018 Commonwealth Games